The 2014–15 Ekstraklasa (currently named T-Mobile Ekstraklasa due to sponsorship reasons), is the 81st season of the highest level of football leagues in the Polish football league system since its establishment in 1927. It began on 18 July 2014. A total of 16 teams are participating, 14 of which competed in the league during the 2013–14 season, while the remaining two were promoted from the I Liga. Each team played a total of 30 matches, half at home and half away.

Legia Warsaw were the defending champions, having won their 10th title last season, but Lech Poznań won their 7th title.

Teams
Promotion and relegation as usual was determined by the position in the table from prior season. The bottom two teams were directly relegated to the I Liga, while the top two teams are promoted to the Ekstraklasa.

Widzew Łódź and Zagłębie Lubin finished in 15th and 16th place, respectively, and were relegated to the Polish First League as a result. GKS Bełchatów and Górnik Łęczna finished 1st and 2nd, respectively, in the I Liga gained promotion.

Stadium and locations

Personnel and kits

League table

Positions by round

Results

Play-offs

Championship round

League table

Positions by round

Results

Relegation round

League table

Positions by round

Results

Season statistics

Top goalscorers

Top assists

References

External links
  
Ekstraklasa at uefa.com

2014-15
Pol
1